New Alcatraz (named Boa on VHS and DVD), is a 2002 American direct-to-video science fiction action horror film. It was directed by Phillip Roth and starred Dean Cain. In the middle of Antarctica, a high maximum-security prison called New Alcatraz has recently become operational. When a mining crew inside the prison accidentally drills into a strange rock formation, a giant, prehistoric boa constrictor is unleashed upon the prison and goes on a killing rampage. It is up to the prison staff, inmates, two paleontologists, and a group of soldiers to hunt down and eliminate the beast.

Plot
In New Alcatraz, the world's most secure prison located in Antarctica, a drilling operation inadvertently releases a giant,  boa constrictor from a large, hollow rock that had been preserving it in suspended animation. The snake chews a hole through the ice, enabling it to escape into the prison. The hole is discovered by workers and a guard is placed on it until the engineers can assess the hole and block it up. Jenkins, the guard, hears a strange hissing noise in the tunnels and is sent by Sergeant Quinn, his supervisor, to investigate; Jenkins, unnerved, requests backup, causing Quinn to send the engineers, Poluso and Goodman, to help him. Jenkins is stalked and killed by the snake; arriving on scene, Poluso and Goodman grumble about being woken up. Blood drips down from the pipes onto Poluso, causing him to stare up in confusion, just as the snake attacks him and Goodman. The engineers’ screams can be heard as the snake begins to move further into the prison. The prison sends out a distress call which is received by the United States military. They hire paleontologist Robert Trenton and his wife Jessica to assist a military team led by Major Larsten in the search to destroy the snake. When they arrive at the prison, they discover a group of survivors, led be head of security Quinn and prison warden Fred Riley.

The security and military personnel split up and set out to find and kill the snake whilst Robert, Jessica and Fred watch on in the control room. A soldier named McCarthy is killed by the snake while his partner Simmons is found shot dead; one by one, the other personnel are also killed. Robert and Jessica join in the hunt. After a skirmish with the snake, a gas pipe ruptures and explodes, killing the remaining security and military members. Robert and Jessica survive and flee from the snake, but Jessica is seemingly killed. Robert returns to the security room and convinces Fred to release the prisoners to help in their escape. Fred releases the prisoners, and the group devises a plan to escape. During the escape, one of the prisoners, a “black hat” hacker named Kelly Mitich, attempts to save himself, only to be killed by the snake and accidentally causing another gas explosion, killing Fred. Meanwhile, the other group led by Chechen prisoner Yuri Breshcov and his cousin Peter Yuvol who had been arrested at the beginning of the film for attempting to purchase mid-range nuclear missiles for Chechnya. He finds Jessica alive, and they take her in. The snake then kills two of the prisoners, but Yuri and Jessica escape to the surface. Meanwhile, Robert and prisoner Patricia O'Boyle, a member of the Irish Republican Army, attempt to escape, although the snake kills Patricia while Robert escapes to the surface. Robert, Jessica, and Yuri attempt to escape on the military plane, although the snake sneaks onboard and kills one of the pilots. In the ensuing battle, the snake is ejected from the plane, but Yuri is dragged out with it, and the two fall to their deaths. Robert and Jessica, bewildered but alive, fly to safety.

Cast
Dean Cain as Dr. Robert Trenton
Elizabeth Lackey as Dr. Jessica Platt-Trenton
Mark Sheppard as Yuri Breshcov
Dean Biasucci as Major Larsten
Craig Wasson as Warden Fred Riley
Grand L. Bush as Sergeant Quinn
Richard Tanner as Peter Yuvol
Amanda Reyne as Patricia O'Boyle
Greg Collins as Scott Poluso
Gary Hershberger as Goodman
Dana Ashbrook as Kelly Mitich
Robert Madrid as Jose
Chris Ufland as Jenkins
Christopher Michael as Captain Thomas
Ron Otis as McCarthy

Critical reception
Boa was released to compete with Python II (2002), a sequel to one of the most popular made-for-television snake movies of all time, Python. Boa was a critical failure, with reviews citing bad acting and poor special effects.

Sequel
Boa vs. Python was released after the success of the Python franchise and the failure of Boa; Boa vs. Python was also a critical failure. The filmmakers had decided to make a crossover with Python and Boa, involving the two types of snakes fighting each other. It has been noted that Boa vs. Python was inspired by Alien vs. Predator (2004).

Release
Both the DVD and VHS versions have been out of print as of 2010, but they can be found online and at Netflix.

See also
 List of killer snake films

External links
 

2002 television films
2002 films
2002 horror films
2002 action thriller films
American natural horror films
American action horror films
American horror thriller films
Films about snakes
American prison films
2000s prison films
Giant monster films
American horror television films
Films set in Antarctica
Sony Pictures direct-to-video films
Films directed by Phillip J. Roth
2000s English-language films
2000s American films